Tatiana Khalil (born 3 November 1992) is a Lebanese football player and coach who plays as a midfielder for Lebanese club SAS. She is also head coach of the under-19 team of SAS, and the assistant coach of the Lebanon women's national team.

Managerial career 
In 2022, Khalil was head coach of the under-19 team of SAS, and assistant coach of the Lebanon women's national team.

Career statistics

International
Scores and results list Lebanon's goal tally first, score column indicates score after each Khalil goal.

Honours 
SAS
 Lebanese Women's Football League: 2018–19, 2019–20, 2021–22

Lebanon
 WAFF Women's Championship third place: 2019

See also
 List of Lebanon women's international footballers

References

External links

 
 

1992 births
Living people
Sportspeople from Valence, Drôme
Footballers from Auvergne-Rhône-Alpes
Lebanese women's footballers
Women's association football midfielders
Stars Association for Sports players
Lebanese Women's Football League players
Lebanon women's international footballers
Association football coaches
Lebanese football managers
Female association football managers
Women's association football managers